Palace Attendant was a title in Imperial China comparable to that of Chief Minister, also known as Grand chancellor or Counselor-in-chief. These are in turn collective terms designating the chief policy maker of the central government in Imperial China. They designated the head of the central government during the Qin and Han dynasties and during the Three Kingdoms period, the "highest official advisor to the Emperor."

History
The term Chief Minister denoted a chancellor (xiangguo, 相國; chengxiang, 丞相) in Western Han and Qing. In Western Han, the Chief Minister's lieutenants, da sikong, lyushi dafu (censor-general), da sima and taiwei (respectively, commander and defender-in-chief), were also chief ministers. In Easter Han it nominally denoted a situ (chancellor), sikong (censor-general), and taiwei (defender-in-chief). 

In the Six Dynasties period the term Chief Minister denoted several holders of power serving as top administrators. Among them are zhongshun jian (inspector general of the Secretariat), zhongshu ling (President of the Secretariat), shizhong (palace attendant), and shangshu ling and puye (president and vice-president of the Department of State Affairs). During the Tang dynasty and the Sui dynasty, the Three Departments' chiefs were "chief ministers by default," though during the Sui unofficial, "de facto" chief ministers were appointed as well.

The status and functions of Shizong underwent great changes. It designated a close minister serving the Emperor.

Notable Shizhong
Lu Wan  (died 194 BC), Western Han dynasty
Wei Qing (died 106 BC), Western Han dynasty
Chen Qian (522–566), Chen dynasty
Chen Shubao (553–604), Chen dynasty
Lü Pi (died 461), Northern Wei dynasty
Yuan Xie (died 508), Northern Wei dynasty

References 

Government of Imperial China
Government of the Sui dynasty
Government of the Tang dynasty